Bonnaye Mims (born December 12, 1952) is an American politician. She is a member of the Missouri House of Representatives, having served since 2013. She is a member of the Democratic party. She lost her re-election bid to Richard Brown (Missouri politician) in 2016.

References

1952 births
Living people
African-American state legislators in Missouri
Politicians from Kansas City, Missouri
Women state legislators in Missouri
Democratic Party members of the Missouri House of Representatives
21st-century American politicians
21st-century American women politicians
21st-century African-American women
21st-century African-American politicians
20th-century African-American people
20th-century African-American women